Philip Stanhope, 3rd Earl of Chesterfield (3 February 1673 – 27 January 1726) was an English nobleman, the eldest son of Philip Stanhope, 2nd Earl of Chesterfield, by his third wife, the former Lady Elizabeth Dormer.

In 1692, Stanhope married Lady Elizabeth Savile, daughter of the Marquess of Halifax.  He was succeeded by his son, Philip Stanhope, 4th Earl of Chesterfield. His second son was Sir William Stanhope, a politician.

References

1673 births
1726 deaths
Philip
Earls of Chesterfield